Thomas G. Taylor (born August 2, 1948) is an American politician. He was a member of the Mississippi House of Representatives from the 28th District, first elected in 2011. He is a member of the Republican party.

References

1948 births
Living people
Members of the Mississippi House of Representatives
People from Bruce, Mississippi
People from Bolivar County, Mississippi